Gresham College is an institution of higher learning located at Barnard's Inn Hall off Holborn in Central London, England. It does not enrol students or award degrees. It was founded in 1597 under the will of Sir Thomas Gresham, and hosts over 140 free public lectures every year. Since 2001, all lectures have also been made available online. The current Provost is Professor Martin Elliott.

History

Founding and early years
Sir Thomas Gresham, founder of the Royal Exchange, left his estate jointly to the City of London Corporation and to the Mercers' Company, which today support the college through the Joint Grand Gresham Committee under the presidency of the Lord Mayor of London. Gresham's will provided for the setting up of the college – in Gresham's mansion in Bishopsgate, on the site now occupied by Tower 42, the former NatWest Tower – and endowed it with the rental income from shops sited around the Royal Exchange, which Gresham had established.

The early success of the college led to the incorporation of the Royal Society in 1660, which pursued its activities at the college in Bishopsgate before moving to its own premises in Crane Court in 1710. The college remained in Gresham's mansion in Bishopsgate until 1768, and moved about London thereafter until the construction in 1842 of its own buildings in Gresham Street EC2. Gresham College did not become part of the University of London on the founding of the university in the 19th century, although a close association between the college and the university persisted for many years. Since 1991, the college has operated at Barnard's Inn Hall, Holborn EC1.

Gresham College today
Since 2000, the college regularly welcomes visiting speakers who deliver lectures on topics outside its usual range, and it also hosts occasional seminars and conferences.  Today the college provides over 140 lectures a year, all of which are free and open to the public.

Since 2001, the college has been recording its lectures and releasing them online in what is now an archive of over 2,000 lectures. Since 2007, lectures have also been available through YouTube with 30,891,433 views .

Annual lectures series of particular note hosted by the college include: the Gresham Special Lecture, the Annual Lord Mayor's Event, and the Gray's Inn Reading.

The college is a registered charity under English law.

Professors
The seven original Gresham College professorships that date back to the origins of the college are as follows:

 Astronomy
 Divinity
 Geometry
 Law
 Music
 Physic
 Rhetoric

These original endowed chairs reflect the curriculum of the medieval university (the trivium and quadrivium); but as a place for the public and frequent voicing of new ideas, the college played an important role in the Enlightenment and in the formation of the Royal Society. Early distinguished Gresham College professors included Christopher Wren, who lectured on astronomy in the 17th century and Robert Hooke, who was Professor of Geometry from 1665 until 1704.The professors received £50 a year, and the terms of their position were very precise, for example:

Today three further professorships have been added to take account of areas not otherwise covered by the original Professorships:

 Commerce, established in 1985.
 Environment, established in 2014.
 Information Technology, established in 2015.

The professors currently hold their positions for three years, extendable for a fourth year, and give six lectures a year.  There are also regular visiting professors appointed to give series of lectures at the College, and a large number of single-lecture speakers.

Gresham Special Lecture series

The Gresham Special Lecture – now called The Sir Thomas Gresham Annual Lecture – originated in 1983 as a free public lecture delivered by a prominent speaker. It was devised as a focus-point among the many free public lectures offered every year.

 2021: Sir Nicholas Kenyon – 'The Barbican Centre at 40 – Past, Present and Future'
 2020: No lecture
 2019: Dr John Guy – 'Sir Thomas Gresham 1519–2019'
 2018: Dame Julia Slingo FRS – 'Climate Change: A Defining Challenge for the 21st Century'
 2017: Alan Rusbridger – 'A World Without News?'
 2016: The Rt Hon the Baroness Blackstone – 'Universities: Some Policy Dilemmas'
 2015: Dame Barbara Stocking DBE – 'Women's Careers: From Oxfam to a Cambridge College'
 2014: Stephen Hodder MBE – 'Continuity and Development in Architecture'
 2013: Sir Richard Peter Lambert – 'The UK and the New Face of Europe'
 2012: The Rt Hon John Bercow – 'Parliament and the Public: Strangers or Friends?'
 2011: Sir Adam Roberts – 'Reinventing the Wheel: The cost of neglecting international history'
 2010: Lord Phillips of Worth Matravers – 'The Challenges of the New Supreme Court'
 2009: Niall Ferguson – 'The Ascent of money: An evolutionary approach to financial history'
 2008: The Lord Archbishop of Canterbury, Rowan Williams – 'Early Christianity & Today: Some shared questions' 
 2007: Sir Roy Strong – 'The Beauty of Holiness and its Perils (or what is to happen to 10,000 parish churches?)'
 2006: Baroness Kennedy of The Shaws – 'Walking the Line: Preserving liberty in times of insecurity'
 2005: Lord Winston – 'Should we trust the scientists?'
 2004: Lord Rees of Ludlow – 'Science in a Complex World: Wonders, Prospects and Threats'
 2003: Sir Harold Kroto – 'I think, therefore I am – a scientist'
 2002: M. S. Swaminathan – 'Towards Freedom from Hunger: A Global Food for Sustainable Development Initiative'
 2001: Dr Charles Saumarez Smith – 'Commerce and Culture in the Late Twentieth Century'
 2000: Hans Küng – 'A Global Ethics – A Challenge for the New Millennium'
 1999: Baroness Williams of Crosby – 'Snakes and Ladders: A reflection on a post-war political life'
 1998: Sir Adrian Cadbury – 'The Future for Governance: The rules of the game'
 1997: Dr Ian Archer – 'Thomas Gresham's London'
 1996: Sir Peter Middleton – 'Banking Today'
 1995: Sir Michael Howard – 'Reflections on the 50th Anniversary of VE Day'
 1993: Howard Davies – 'The City and Manufacturing Industry'
 1992: Baron Hermann von Richthofen – 'A United Germany in the New Europe'
 1991: Revd. Dr J. Polkinghorne – 'Science and Theology: Traffic across the frontier'
 1989: Sir Ralf Dahrendorf – 'The Decline of Socialism'
 1988: The Most Reverend Kirill Archbishop of Smolensk – 'Russian Orthodox Church Life Today: The Second Millennium'
 1987: Sir George Porter – 'Popular and Unpopular Science'
 1985: The Rt Hon The Lord Young of Graffham – 'The Rise and Fall of the Entrepreneur'
 1984: Lord Blake – 'Monarchy'
 1983: Lord Scarman – 'Human Rights and the Democratic Process'

Excerpts from the Last Will of Sir Thomas Gresham (1575)

See also
 Gresham College and the formation of the Royal Society
 Third oldest university in England debate
Gresham's School
Scholars and Literati at the Gresham College (1597–1800), Repertorium Eruditorum Totius Europae – RETE

Notes

References

External links

 
 
 A Brief History of Gresham College 1497–1997 from the Gresham College website

 
1597 establishments in England
Education in the City of London
Educational institutions established in the 1590s
Higher education colleges in London
Lecture series
Charities based in London